Azhar Ali Abidi (born 6 February 1968 in Wah, Pakistan{cn}}) is a Pakistani Australian author and translator. He went to school in Pakistan and later studied electrical engineering at the Imperial College London and Master of Business Administration at the University of Melbourne. He migrated to Australia in 1994 and lives in Melbourne, Australia.

Career
Abidi has written translations, travelogues, and a number of short stories, including the Borgesian The Secret History of the Flying Carpet, which is a fictitious story in a seemingly scholarly essay. His first novel, Passarola Rising (2006), was published by Viking Penguin in Australia, USA, Canada and India and translated into Spanish and Portuguese. It is set in Europe during the eighteenth century and is the fictionalised story of a true life Brazilian priest and aviation pioneer, Bartolomeu de Gusmão, who built a flying ship but fell foul of the Inquisition. Written in the style of an old-fashioned adventure story, it is a veiled criticism of the scientific materialism emerging from the European Enlightenment, and its inability to explain spiritual and supernatural phenomena. Passarola Rising was shortlisted for the 2006 Melbourne Literature Prize.

In his second novel, Twilight (2008), Abidi turns to domestic and realist themes. Set in Pakistan during the 1980s, it is the story of an elderly matriarch, and her reaction to the changes she sees in her family and society during the turbulent times. Twilight is published by Text Publishing in Australia and by Viking Penguin in the United States and India. It appears in the United States as The House of Bilqis (2009).

In 2010, Abidi wrote an essay on Pakistan, The Road to Chitral, for Granta Online, which is a travelogue and a meditation on violence in the region.

Bibliography
Novels
Passarola Rising (2006) 
La maquina de volar (2008) , 9788483650509
Twilight (2008) (reissued in United States as The House of Bilqis) (2009) 
La casa degli amori sognati (2010) 
Il mio matrimonio pakistano (2011) 

Translations
"Old Croc" - a short story by Hasan Manzar (Annual of Urdu Studies, Vol 16, 2001)
"The Fall of Baghdad" - essay by Azeem Beg Chughtai (Annual of Urdu Studies, Vol 18, 2003)

Short Stories/Essays
"Secret History of the Flying Carpet", Meanjin, Vol 63, No 2, 2004 (reissued in United States in Southwest Review, Vol 91, No 1, 2006)
"Rosa", Words Without Borders, April 2006
"A Passage to the Past",  The Pakistan of Azhar's childhood was already coming to an end when he took his leave, The Age, June 2009
"Road to Chitral", Granta, September 2010

Interviews
 The Australian interviews Azhar Abidi
The Age feature on Azhar Abidi
 The Dawn interview
Azhar Abidi examines the emigrant experience in the Wall Street Journal

Notes

Living people
1968 births
Pakistani novelists
Pakistani translators
21st-century Australian novelists
Australian male novelists
Australian male short story writers
Australian translators
Pakistani emigrants to Australia
21st-century Australian short story writers
21st-century Pakistani short story writers
Australian writers of Pakistani descent
21st-century Australian male writers
21st-century translators